The HTC Butterfly is an Android-based, 4G LTE-capable smartphone designed and developed by HTC. First announced for release in Japan by Japanese carrier KDDI as the HTC J Butterfly (HTL21), the J Butterfly was released in Japan on 9 December 2012 as the successor to the HTC J. Outside Japan, in other Asian countries, the phone was released as the HTC Butterfly (X920d) and in China and Russia as the HTC Butterfly (X920e). The Chinese/Russian and US versions of the Butterfly do not have a microSD slot. In the United States, the Butterfly was released as the HTC Droid DNA as a Verizon exclusive, supporting wireless charging. The DNA would become Verizon's final non-Motorola Droid smartphone; following its replacement in August 2013 by the HTC One and Droid Maxx, the carrier announced that all future Droid phones would be built exclusively by Motorola. In June 2013, the Butterfly was succeeded by the HTC Butterfly S.

It is the second smartphone in the world to be announced with a 1080p display, after Oppo's Find 5, and the first phone to be released with one. The phone has Android version 4.1, a quad-core 1.5 GHz Snapdragon S4 Pro processor, an 8-megapixel rear camera, and a 2.1-megapixel front camera. It comes with 2 GB of RAM and a 2020 mAh battery.

The Butterfly is water resistant with an IP rating of X5 and has a 5-inch "Super LCD 3" display with full HD resolution (1920x1080 pixels). This translates to a pixel density of 440 ppi. In comparison,  The HTC One X offers 312 ppi. The Motorola Droid RAZR MAXX HD (HD has 720p display) at 312ppi, the iPhone 5's "Retina display", 326 ppi, and the Nokia Lumia 920, 332 ppi. The display is manufactured by Sharp, JDI.

In India it was launched at a price of 44,900, making it the most expensive Android smartphone in India at the time. However, after the launch of Vertu Ti for 600,000, it lost that title.

In summer of 2013, the Butterfly was succeeded by the HTC Butterfly S in Asia. The Butterfly S was never released in Japan. The J Butterfly was succeeded by a phone of the same name in summer of 2014, later released as the Butterfly 2 in other Asian markets.

References

External links 
 Official website for the HTC J Butterfly (HTL21)
 Official website for the HTC Droid DNA
 Official website for the HTC Butterfly (India) (X920d)
 Official website for the HTC Butterfly (Singapore) (X920d)
 Official website for the HTC Butterfly (Taiwan) (X920d)
 Official website for the HTC Butterfly (Thailand) (X920d)
 Official website for the HTC Butterfly (China) (X920e)
 Official website for the HTC Butterfly (Russia) (X920e)

Butterfly
Android (operating system) devices
Discontinued smartphones